Angelina Köhler (born 12 November 2000) is a German swimmer. She competed in the women's 100 metre butterfly at the 2019 World Aquatics Championships held in Gwangju, South Korea. In 2018, she won the silver medal in the 100 m butterfly and the bronze medal in the 50 m butterfly event at the Summer Youth Olympics in Buenos Aires, Argentina.

References

External links
 

2000 births
Living people
German female swimmers
Place of birth missing (living people)
Swimmers at the 2018 Summer Youth Olympics
Female butterfly swimmers